Sean Greene (born July 16, 1987) is a regular-footed American professional skateboarder.

Early life 
Greene was born and raised in Irving, Texas. After watching Evel Knievel videos as a child, Greene aspired to be a stuntman.

Skateboarding career 
Greene moved to San Francisco after being encouraged by his friend Ceno. Greene is known for his gutsy approach to the steep streets of San Francisco. As a rider for GX1000, Greene and his cohorts are recognized for their fearless and often creative approach to riding down San Francisco's steepest hills. In 2017, Greene ollied into and rode down one of the steepest parts of Kearny Street.

Skate video parts 

 2016: The GX1000 Video - GX1000
 2017: Deep Fried "Over Easy" - Cody Thompson
 2017: Adrenaline Junkie - GX1000
 2018: Roll Up - GX1000
 2018: El Camino - GX1000

Sponsors 
GX1000, Spitfire, Converse, Supreme, Independent Truck Company, Bronson Speed Co., Mob Grip, Hombre Hardware

References 

1987 births
American skateboarders
Living people